Northern Fury FC is an association football club based in Townsville, Queensland, Australia. The club was formed in 2009 as one of two expansion teams to the A-League (along with Gold Coast United).

The club folded at the end of the 2010–11 A-League season before being revived in the National Premier Leagues Queensland competition in 2013.

Key
Key to league competitions:

 A-League (A-League) – Australia's top football league, established in 2005.
 National Premier Leagues Queensland (NPL Queensland) – The first tier of football in Queensland.

Key to colours and symbols:

Key to league record:
 Season = The year and article of the season
 Pos = Final position
 Pld = Matches played
 W = Matches won
 D = Matches drawn
 L = Matches lost
 GF = Goals scored
 GA = Goals against
 Pts = Points

Key to cup record:
 En-dash (–) = North Queensland United did not participate
 R1 = First round
 R2 = Second round, etc.
 QF = Quarter-finals
 SF = Semi-finals
 RU = Runners-up
 W = Winners

Seasons

References
Ultimate A-League
aleaguestats.com

Northern Fury FC seasons
Northern Fury FC
N